Joshua William Dun (born June 18, 1988) is an American musician. He is best known as the drummer of the musical duo Twenty One Pilots, alongside Tyler Joseph. He has collaborated with a variety of other artists as well.

Early life 
Joshua William Dun was born in Columbus, Ohio, on June 18, 1988, the son of hospice social worker Laura Lee Dun (née McCollum) and physical therapy assistant William Earl "Bill" Dun. He has two sisters and a brother. His great-great-great-grandparents were the American rancher Edwin Dun, who worked as an agricultural advisor to Japan, and his Japanese wife Tsuru. He mainly listened to punk rock when he was growing up. His parents set strict rules on what music he could listen to, about which he later said, "I'd hide albums like Green Day's Dookie underneath my bed. Sometimes they'd find them and get real mad. They'd find a Christian alternative, like Relient K, and make me listen to that." He initially took trumpet lessons at school and then turned his attention to drums, teaching himself how to play. One method Dun references was imitating the beats of the records he'd buy on an electronic drum kit. He worked at Guitar Center for three years, where he met former Twenty One Pilots drummer Chris Salih, who eventually introduced him to future bandmate Tyler Joseph.

Career 
In March 2010, Dun joined House of Heroes after the band's drummer, Colin Rigsby, took a break to spend more time with his family. In Rigby's place, Dun played the drums for many tracks on the band's album Suburba. Dun also makes an appearance in the music video for the single "God Save the Foolish Kings." He also took part in House of Heroes' live tour until October, when Rigsby returned to his duties.

After quitting his job at Guitar Center, Dun planned to leave for Nashville, Tennessee in pursuit of a drum career in the industry; however, he was stopped by Twenty One Pilots drummer Chris Salih, who offered him his role. He went on to play a show with Tyler Joseph after Salih and bassist Nick Thomas left the group due to busy schedules. They played one song before police officers showed up and cancelled the show. Dun subsequently became the band's full-time drummer.

As a duo Twenty One Pilots released the band's second studio album, Regional at Best, on July 8, 2011 and signed with record label Fueled by Ramen, a subsidiary of Atlantic Records in April 2012.

Twenty One Pilots' third studio album, Vessel, was released on January 8, 2013 through Fueled by Ramen and reached no. 21 on the Billboard 200.

The band's fourth studio album, Blurryface, was released on May 17, 2015, two days ahead of its intended release date. At this point in Twenty One Pilots' career, the band had topped the charts with their hit single "Stressed Out" – the song's music video being filmed at Dun's childhood home, and has since received over 2.6 billion views on YouTube.

Their fifth studio album, Trench, was released on October 5, 2018. The album was the first release of the newly revived Elektra Music Group.

On April 9, 2020, the duo released a new single "Level of Concern". The song's lyrics reference the anxiety and worry during the beginning of the COVID-19 pandemic. Also, the accompanying music video for the track was filmed in both Joseph and Dun's respective homes while they were under lockdown due to the U.S. state and local government responses to the COVID-19 pandemic.

On December 8, 2020, Twenty One Pilots released a Christmas song, titled "Christmas Saves the Year", during a Twitch livestream hosted by Tyler Joseph.

The duo's sixth studio album, Scaled and Icy, was released on May 21, 2021. The name of the record was revealed alongside a logo, which read "Shy Away". The lead single of the album, named "Shy Away", was released on April 7, 2021, alongside a music video for the track which was uploaded onto the duo's YouTube channel the same day.

Personal life 
Dun and Twenty One Pilots bandmate Tyler Joseph both have an "X" tattoo on their body symbolizing their dedication to their hometown fans in Columbus, Ohio. They received it onstage during their hometown show at the Lifestyle Communities Pavilion on April 26, 2013. Dun also sports the name "Tyler" above his left knee. They are both fans of the Ohio State Buckeyes.

Dun dated actress and singer Debby Ryan from May 2013 to September 2014. They resumed their relationship sometime after. They were married in Austin, Texas, on December 31, 2019.

Discography

House of Heroes
 Suburba (2010)

Twenty One Pilots

 Regional at Best (2011)
 Vessel (2013)
 Blurryface (2015)
 Trench (2018)
 Scaled and Icy (2021)

With other artists
 Dun performed on George Watsky's 2016 single "Midnight Heart" for the album x Infinity and cameoed in the music video.
 Dun appeared on two singles from Canadian singer and songwriter Lights' album, Skin and Earth: "Savage" and "Almost Had Me".
 In 2017, Dun partnered with Hayley Williams of Paramore to promote her hair dye line "Good Dye Young".
In 2017, Dun played drums on Goldfinger's song "Orthodontist Girl" from the album The Knife.
 In 2020, Dun played guest drums on The Hunna song "Dark Times".
 In March 2022, Dun contributed drums and percussion to the Lights song "In My Head".

Awards and nominations

See also 
 Tyler Joseph
 List of songs recorded by Twenty One Pilots

Notes

References

External links 

 Josh Dun on Twitter
 

1988 births
Living people
American drummers
American male drummers
Twenty One Pilots members
Fueled by Ramen artists
Musicians from Columbus, Ohio
American percussionists
American trumpeters
American male trumpeters
21st-century American drummers